The 1987 Meerut massacre were a series of violent communal disturbances between Hindus and Muslims in the northern Uttar Pradesh town Meerut which occurred from March to June 1987, which resulted in the death of more than 100 people.

Background 
The tension started in 1986 when the black seal Babri Masjid in Ayodhya was opened by the Government which led the Muslim extremists to make some hateful speeches. It was reiterated by Hindus that Babri Masjid was constructed by Babur after the demolition of a Ram Mandir back in 1528 A.D.

Violence 

Inflammatory speeches were made by Muslim Extremist leaders, which created communal tensions in the area. This resulted in  Muslims organising a rally held in March 1987 by the All India Babri Masjid Action Committee, a non-government organization representing Muslims which increased communal tensions in Meerut and ultimately led to communal clashes in April. 10 people died in these riots and there were many misinformation spread on murder of a Hindu man due to a land dispute aggravated issues, due to which additional police and subsequently the army and CRPF being called in to restore order.

The first acts of violence were between the police and Muslims in which the police fired on protesting Muslims but later on became a communal riot between Hindus and Muslims. A Hindu shop owner was stabbed to death by Muslim which led Muslims being targeted during the violence by the police and the Hindu rioters which killed Hundreds  in the next few days as the riots spread to Modinagar. Estimated property loss was around 50 crores. Hindu and Muslim doctors faced the wrath of their own community for treating patients of other community.

According to People's Union for Civil Liberties, after a Muslim girl was crushed under police jeep. This resulted in the police firing at the mob which killed several people. A car was also attacked by the Muslim mob, killing inside a famous local Hindu doctor named Dr Prabhat.

50 gazetted police officers and more than 60 companies of the PAC, the Central Reserve Police Force (CRPF) and the Army had to control the riots. Many Muslims were burnt alive by a Hindu mob in villages on the outskirts of Meerut city.

PAC officials have been charged by court of filling buses with Muslims taken from their homes and killing them. Later throwing those dead bodies in the canal.

Trials and 2018 verdict 
On 6 September 2018, the Delhi High Court reserved its verdict in the case.
On 31 October 2018, the Delhi High Court convicted 16 former PAC personnel for life after finding them guilty of the murder of 42 people.

References 

Meerut
History of Meerut
1987 murders in India
Massacres in India
1987 riots
Massacres in 1987